Rosana is a municipality in the state of São Paulo in Brazil. The population is 16,281 (2020 est.) in an area of 744 km². The elevation is 236 m. The municipality is the westernmost municipality in the state of São Paulo.

The municipality contains part of the  Great Pontal Reserve, created in 1942.

References 

 
Populated places established in 1892